The Clinical and Laboratory Standards Institute (CLSI) is a volunteer-driven, membership-supported, not-for-profit, standards development organization. CLSI promotes the development and use of voluntary laboratory consensus standards and guidelines within the health care community.

History 
In 1968, 31 clinicians and laboratory scientists representing 15 organizations met to develop a formal consensus process for standardization. In 1977, CLSI was accredited by the American National Standards Institute (ANSI) as a voluntary consensus standards organization. At about the same time, CLSI became the home of the National Reference System for the Clinical Laboratory (NRSCL), a collection of broadly understood reference systems intended to improve the comparability of test results, consistent with the needs of medical practice.

CLSI is a global association of 1,500+ member organizations and individual members, as well as more than 2,000 volunteers. Until 2005, CLSI was called the National Committee for Clinical Laboratory Standards (NCCLS).

Committees 
CLSI documents are developed by committees composed of experts in medical testing or ancillary aspects of these activities. Development of CLSI standards is a dynamic process. Each CLSI committee produces consensus documents related to a specific discipline.

The consensus process
CLSI's core business is the development of globally applicable voluntary consensus standards and guidelines for the clinical laboratory. CLSI develops consensus documents through an accredited consensus process.

Volunteers
CLSI relies on more than 2,000 volunteers. Volunteers and mentors also work with CLSI's Global Health Partnerships to help establish laboratory quality management systems in resource-limited countries.

Global health partnerships 
CLSI provides direct assistance in Sub-Saharan Africa to combat HIV/AIDS and other infectious diseases. With grants from the US-based PEPFAR (President's Emergency Plan for AIDS Relief) program administered by a cooperative agreement from the Centers for Disease Control and Prevention (CDC) and the National Institute of Allergy and Infectious Diseases (NIAID), CLSI has been directly engaged in essential laboratory services improvement. During the past several years, CLSI mentors, volunteers, and staff have provided technical assistance in Côte d'Ivoire, Democratic Republic of the Congo, Dominican Republic, Ethiopia, Georgia, Ghana, Kazakhstan, Kenya, Kyrgyzstan, Malawi, Mali, Mozambique, Namibia, Nigeria, Peru, Rwanda, Tajikistan, Tanzania, Ukraine, Vietnam and Zambia.

International Organization for Standardization (ISO)

CLSI participates in the development of international standards as the Secretariat of ISO Technical Committee (TC) 212, clinical laboratory testing and in vitro diagnostic test systems, a responsibility that was delegated to CLSI by the American National Standards Institute (ANSI), which is an ISO member body. CLSI also serves as the administrator for the US Technical Advisory Committee (TAG) for ISO/TC 212.

See also
Technical standard
International standards
PEPFAR

References

External links
 
 CLSI Home page
 

Standards organizations in the United States